Garden Reach Assembly constituency was a Legislative Assembly constituency of South 24 Parganas district in the Indian state of West Bengal.

Overview
As a consequence of the orders of the Delimitation Commission, Garden Reach Assembly constituency ceases to exist from 2011.
 
It was part of Diamond Harbour (Lok Sabha constituency).:

Members of Legislative Assembly

Election results

1977-2006
In the 2006 state assembly elections Abdul Khaleque Molla of Congress won the 114 Garden Reach assembly seat defeating his nearest rival Mohammed Amin of CPI(M). Mohammed Amin of CPI(M) defeated Fazle Azim Molla of Trinamool Congress in 2001 and of Congress in 1996. Fazle Azim Molla of Congress defeated Dilip Sen of CPI(M) in 1991 and Mohammed Amin of CPI(M) in 1987. Shamsuzzoha of Congress defeated Chhedilal Singh of CPI(M) in 1982. Chhedilal Singh of CPI(M) defeated S.M.Abdullah of Congress in 1977.

1951-1972
Chhedilal Singh of CPI(M) won in 1972. S.M.Abdullah of Congress won in 1971. Arun Sen of CPI won in 1969. S.M.Abdullah of Congress won in 1967 and 1962. Shaikh Abduallah Farooquie of CPI won in 1957. S.M. Abdullah of Congress won in independent India’s first election in 1951.

References

Former assembly constituencies of West Bengal
Politics of South 24 Parganas district